Caldwell Parish is a parish located in the U.S. state of Louisiana. As of 2020, its population was 9,645. The parish seat is Columbia. Most residents live in the country even beyond the three rural communities in the parish.

History

Caldwell Parish was formed in 1838 from part of Ouachita & Catahoula Parishes.  The prominent geographical feature is the Ouachita River which divides the parish into alluvial farmland on the east bank and pineland hill country on the west.  The area was originally occupied by Native Americans as evidenced by the Indian mounds built along the Ouachita & Boeuf Rivers 3500 B.C. – 1500 A.D.

In the late 1700s the Spanish government began issuing land grants on the east bank farmland to settlers who were all French.  Their French names such as Ferrand, Hebert, Duchesne and Oliveaux are still common to the parish.  The first community in the parish was Copenhagen, which was settled by Scandinavians circa 1800 on the west bank downriver from the French.  This community and its Danish names all disappeared except for its tombstones.  In 1827, Daniel Humphreys founded “New Kentucky” which became Columbia and the parish seat when the parish was founded.  These families were predominantly Scotch-Irish & English who made the trek from the Carolinas, bringing with them the town name; however, some of the earlier ones came from Kentucky and Tennessee, bringing with them their bear hunting and moonshine making skills.  Along with the plantations came slavery.  Their descendants make up about one-fifth of the parish, being a major impact in shaping Caldwell Parish, well known for individual successes through a strong educational program prior to and after integration.

The site of Columbia was chosen primarily for being at the natural crossing of the Ouachita River by the major trail crossing the parish.  This made it the logical location for a riverport for cotton and timber.  Columbia was a major provider of staves in the 1800s.  The Blanks family became the largest steamboat operator on the Ouachita.  In the middle of the steamboat era came the Civil War.  Caldwell Parish was generally not in favor of secession but soon sent most of its young men to military service in the Confederacy, evidenced by confederate tombstones throughout the parish.  The aftermath of the war resulted in an impoverished parish.  The steamboat era continued strong into the early 1900s but the competition from the St. Louis and Iron Mountain Railroad, built in 1888 eventually overtook the steamboat.

In the early 1900s, La. Central Lumber Co. was formed and built a major sawmill, headquarters, commissary, hotel, swimming pool and complete town of large frame homes – the town of Clarks.  It was such a major supplier of lumber, it received a priority status by the government during World War II.  The mill is gone, but the mill whistle still blows at noon.

Caldwell Parish was well represented with veterans in all the American wars as well as currently in Iraq and Afghanistan.  Our fallen heroes are proudly remembered on a granite monument at courthouse square.  Our soldiers service has and continues to be a major unifying factor for our parish.

Though the American Indians were basically removed from Northeast Louisiana in the early 1800s, their heritage is found in many Caldwell Parish family histories.  Circa 1900, there was a small group of Italian families that moved to Caldwell Parish from Sicily who built most of buildings on the 100 block of Main Street at the riverfront in Columbia; which includes the Louisiana Artist Museum building named the “Schepis” after its Italian architect, builder and proprietor.

Geography

Major highways
  U.S. Highway 165
  Louisiana Highway 4

Adjacent parishes
 Jackson Parish  (northwest)
 Ouachita Parish  (north)
 Richland Parish  (northeast)
 Franklin Parish  (east)
 Catahoula Parish  (southeast)
 La Salle Parish  (south)
 Winn Parish  (southwest)

Communities

Town
 Columbia (parish seat)

Villages
 Clarks
 Grayson

Census-designated place
 Banks Springs

Unincorporated communities
 Copenhagen
 Corey
 Hebert
 Kelly
 Ward 5

Demographics

As of the 2020 United States census, there were 9,645 people, 3,665 households, and 2,534 families residing in the parish. As of the census of 2000, there were 10,560 people, 3,941 households, and 2,817 families residing in the parish. The population density was 20 people per square mile (8/km2). There were 5,035 housing units at an average density of 10 per square mile (4/km2).

In 2000, the racial makeup of the parish was 80.43% White, 17.90% Black or African American, 0.45% Native American, 0.14% Asian, 0.47% from other races, and 0.61% from two or more races. 1.49% of the population were Hispanic or Latino of any race. In 2020, its racial makeup was 78.29% non-Hispanic white, 15.84% African American, 0.2% Native American, 0.445 Asian, 0.03% Pacific Islander, 2.91% multiracial or other, and 2.29% Hispanic or Latino of any race.

Culture
Having a very diverse geographical and plant environment, Caldwell Parish is home to the nearly one-thousand acre Copenhagen Hills Preserve, located southeast of Copenhagen. Run by the Nature Conservancy, it attracts botanical and archeological enthusiasts from a wide area. The University of Louisiana at Monroe owns an eighty-acre outdoor classroom, the Dr. Charles Allen Nature Preserve, located near Hough Bend, that is used primarily for tree identification. The U.S. Army Corps of Engineers owns an outdoor preserve located on Lock and Dam Road. Together with its rivers, lakes and bayous, and the 51,000-acre Boeuf Wildlife Management Area, Caldwell is a huge attraction for hunters and anglers.

Caldwell Parish has been home to The Louisiana Art and Folk Festival since 1956. Held during the second weekend of October on Main Street in Columbia, this festival celebrates the history and culture of Caldwell Parish, with hundreds of pieces of arts and craft, entertainment, and good food. The Louisiana Artists Museum, also on Main Street in the historic Schepis Building, features rotating exhibits and is listed in the National Register of Historic Places. The Martin Homeplace Museum showcases artifacts and memorabilia from Caldwell Parish's rich cultural history in a farmhouse built in 1878 on an 1816 Spanish land grant. It too is on the National Register of Historic Places. The annual Lions Club Championship Rodeo is a three-day event every June, recognized as the longest continuous running rodeo in the state, where more than 15,000 hot dogs are consumed each year.

The Marengo Swamp Ride, the world's largest ATV mud ride, was held yearly on the first weekend in June. Thousands of riders from across the US, as well as from other countries, would converge on the Hebert community in the northeast part of the parish for this event. Proceeds from the ride went to the "Wish I Could" Foundation, which granted wishes to terminally ill children. The last Marengo Swamp Ride was held on June 3, 2017, and was the 32nd annual ride. Wish I Could declined to hold the event for 2018 and 2019, citing changes made to the Boeuf WMA (known locally as Marengo Swamp) by the Louisiana Department of Wildlife and Fisheries, and a lack of cooperation and support by LDWF. At present, Wish I Could has no plans of resurrecting the ride.

Education

The Caldwell Parish School Board serves the parish. There are three elementary schools Columbia Elementary, Central Elementary, and Grayson Elementary in the parish, one Jr high, Caldwell Parish Jr High, and one high school, Caldwell Parish High School, located between Columbia and Grayson. The schools have consistently been highly rated with a long history of student success both in the classroom and beyond. This is truly the pride of the parish.

National Guard
1023RD Engineer Company (Vertical) of the 225th Engineer Brigade resides in Clarks, Louisiana.

Politics

Notable people
 Buddy Caldwell, Louisiana State Attorney General, served 2008–2016.
 J.D. DeBlieux, Louisiana State Senator representing East Baton Rouge Parish, 1956-1960 & 1964-1976
 Graves B. Erskine USMC (1917-1961), Marine Corps General Officer (4-Star) who served in three wars and commanded 3d Marine Division during the Battle of Iwo Jima. Awarded the Silver Star and fourragère in WWI, fighting in five major battles and being wounded twice. His service in WWII included Iwo Jima & 5 other battles. Legion of Merit (2) & Navy Distinguished Service Medal. Post WWII Dir. of Special Ops.
 Garland Gregory, LA Tech Football, 1st Team All America (1941). NFL San Francisco 49ers, 2nd Team All AFC (1947).
 Hubert D. Humphreys, Louisiana historian and native of Grayson
 Pam Kelly, recipient of the Wade Trophy, the most valuable women's collegiate basketball player in the nation
 John J. McKeithen, governor of Louisiana (1964–1972); Louisiana Public Service Commissioner (1955–1964); state representative (1948–1952); U.S. Army combat officer (1942–1945) in the 77th Infantry Division. Mckeithen was awarded two Bronze Stars and Campaign Ribbons for participation in the Battle of Leyte, the reduction of Ie Shima, and Okinawa. 
 W. Fox McKeithen, Louisiana House of Representatives (1984–1988); five-term Louisiana Secretary of State (1988–2005)
 Clay Parker, LSU baseball pitcher and football punter (1981-1985), Major League Baseball (1987-1992), New York Yankees (1989) ERA: 3.68, Detroit Tigers (1991) ERA: 3.18
 Neil Riser, Louisiana State Senator elected in 2007 from the 32nd District, which includes Caldwell Parish, the first Republican from this district since Reconstruction
 Chet D. Traylor, Louisiana Supreme Court, 1997–2009

Gallery

See also

 National Register of Historic Places listings in Caldwell Parish, Louisiana

References

External links

 Official webpage for Caldwell Parish

 
Louisiana parishes
1838 establishments in Louisiana
Populated places established in 1838